Leonato may refer to:

 Governor Leonato, a character in Much Ado About Nothing
 Leonato (tenor), a character in Alessandro
 Prince Leonato, a character in The Imposture
 Léonato, Governor of Messina, a character in Béatrice et Bénédict
 A character in Madness in Valencia

See also
 Leonatos